The Tralee and Dingle Light Railway (TDLR) locomotives 1, 2, 3, 6, and 8 were  locomotives manufactured by the Hunslet Engine Company of Leeds, England between 1889 and 1910.

The Tralee and Dingle Light Railway was incorporated in 1888. Its construction began soon afterwards and  the line opened on 31 March 1891. The first three locomotives arrived from Hunslet Engine Company in 1889 and were used in the construction work. The rail head on Dingle pier was claimed to be the most westerly point reached by a railway in Europe.

These five Hunslet locomotives operated for the Tralee & Dingle and at the 1925 amalgamation and became Great Southern Railways Class 1T or Class KN2.

History
Much of the line was a roadside tramway and the locomotives adorned accordingly with "skirts", to shield the driving wheels and motion, a bell mounted on the boiler, cowcatchers, headlights etc. Although accepted as a legal requirement for road-side tramway lines the "skirts" were removed after only a short period, this giving crews easier access to the oiling points of the motion. As far as can be seen from early photographs of the line these "skirts" never returned. The maximum permitted speed on the roadside lines was  but on fenced sections this was raised to 

The two batches of Hunslet 's were almost identical, certainly to the eye. The main difference was in the number of boiler tubes, increasing the heating surface in the later batch giving a slightly higher tractive effort (by around 1,000 lbf).

All T&D locomotives carried their numbers on cast plates attached to the side tanks.

Locomotive No. 1 was involved in the Camp accident in 1893 when the train “ran away” down the 1 in 29 (3.4%) gradient towards a sharp curve leading onto a bridge over the river. It was said that it hit the curve doing  and went into the river, the locomotive losing a sandbox which was on the top of the boiler behind the chimney.

Locomotive No. 6 was a star of the GSR accident reports, not only featuring more times than all the other T&D locomotives put together but its adventures being featured in a story by the Rev. W. Awdry. The locomotive wasted no time in featuring on report as its first GSR accident was on the new company's first day of operation when it hit a car, and there cannot have been many about in January 1925. In later years it was involved in the running down of a travelling circus and then problems with the Cork and Muskerry Light Railway steam roller, the incident being the one in which Sir Handel played the part in the Rev. Awdry story "The Gallant Old Engine". The worst of these accidents, however, occurred when the locomotive came off the rails on the approach to Lispole viaduct, finishing halfway down the embankment.

Locomotive No.6 was used on the dismantling trains following the closure of the Cavan and Leitrim Railway before itself being scrapped.

Livery
The locomotives were painted dark green lined out with red between two cream lines. The buffer beams were painted red. In  the days of the Great Southern Railways the locomotives were painted in a plain grey livery, the buffer beams being red.

References

2-6-0T locomotives
Steam locomotives of Ireland
Hunslet narrow gauge locomotives
Railway locomotives introduced in 1889
3 ft gauge locomotives
Scrapped locomotives